St. Mary (Macedonian: Пресвета Богородица), also known as the "Nativity of the Virgin Mary" (Macedonian: Раѓање на Пресвета Богородица) is a Macedonian Orthodox Church located in Cambridge, Ontario, Canada.

History
In 1989, fifteen Macedonian families joined together to form a Macedonian organization whose purpose was to gather the Macedonian people and preserve their traditions, culture and faith. The organization's goal was to establish a church for the Macedonian communities from the areas of Cambridge, Kitchener, Waterloo and Guelph. In 1994 the group purchased a building of a former Coptic Church and during the same year the church was registered and blessed by Michael, Archbishop of Ohrid and Macedonia.

External links

American-Canadian Macedonian Orthodox Diocese
Official Website of the Macedonian Orthodox Church

Footnotes

Churches in Cambridge, Ontario
Macedonian Orthodox churches in Canada
Macedonian-Canadian culture